The 2017 UTSA Roadrunners football team represented the University of Texas at San Antonio in the 2017 NCAA Division I FBS football season. The Roadrunners played their home games at the Alamodome in San Antonio, TX, and competed in the West Division of Conference USA (C–USA). They were led by second-year head coach Frank Wilson. They finished the season 6–5, 3–5 in C-USA play to finish in fifth place in the West Division. Despite being bowl eligible for the second consecutive season, the Roadrunners did not receive a bowl bid.

Schedule
UTSA announced its 2017 football schedule on January 26, 2017. The 2017 schedule consisted of 6 home and away games in the regular season. The Roadrunners hosted CUSA foes Marshall, Rice, Southern Miss, and UAB, and traveled to FIU, Louisiana Tech, North Texas, and UTEP.

The Roadrunners hosted one of the three non-conference opponents, Southern from the Southwestern Athletic Conference and traveled to Baylor from the Big 12 Conference and Texas State from the Sun Belt Conference. The Roadrunners were to also host the season opener against Houston from the American Athletic Conference but the game was canceled due to Hurricane Harvey.

The Roadrunners ended the season with their first winning record since 2013, with one of their six wins being a 17–10 victory against Baylor, giving the school its first ever win against a Power Five team.

The game between Houston and UTSA was cancelled in the aftermath of Hurricane Harvey.

Schedule Source:

Game summaries

at Baylor

Southern

at Texas State

Southern Miss

at North Texas

Rice

at UTEP

at FIU

UAB

Marshall

at Louisiana Tech

References

UTSA
UTSA Roadrunners football seasons
UTSA Roadrunners football